Léna Marrocco (born 13 January 1995) is a French former competitive figure skater. She is the 2010 Ice Challenge champion, 2011 Ondrej Nepela Memorial bronze medalist, and 2010 French national champion. She represented France at the 2010 World Junior Championships in The Hague, finishing 11th.

Programs

Competitive highlights 

GP: Grand Prix; JGP: Junior Grand Prix

References

External links 

 

French female single skaters
Living people
1995 births
People from Saint-Aubin-lès-Elbeuf
Sportspeople from Seine-Maritime